4-(gamma-L-glutamylamino)butanoyl-(BtrI acyl-carrier protein) monooxygenase (btrO (gene)) is an enzyme with systematic name 4-(gamma-L-glutamylamino)butanoyl-(BtrI acyl-carrier protein),FMN:oxygen oxidoreductase (2-hydroxylating). This enzyme catalyses the following chemical reaction

 4-(gamma-L-glutamylamino)butanoyl-[BtrI acyl-carrier protein] + FMNH2 + O2  4-(gamma-L-glutamylamino)-(2S)-2-hydroxybutanoyl-[BtrI acyl-carrier protein] + FMN + H2O

4-(gamma-L-glutamylamino)butanoyl-(BtrI acyl-carrier protein) monooxygenase catalyses a step in the biosynthesis of the side chain of the aminoglycoside antibiotics of the butirosin family.

References

External links 
 

EC 1.14.14